Back to My Roots is the 21st studio album by American singer-songwriter Bobby Womack. The album was released on August 24, 1999, by The Right Stuff Records and Capitol Records.

Track listing

References

1999 albums
Bobby Womack albums
Albums produced by Bobby Womack
The Right Stuff Records albums